The 1929 USC Trojans football team represented the University of Southern California (USC) in the 1929 college football season. In their fifth year under head coach Howard Jones, the Trojans compiled a 10–2 record (6–1 against conference opponents), won the Pacific Coast Conference championship, and outscored their opponents by a combined total of 492 to 69. The team defeated Pittsburgh 47–14 in the 1930 Rose Bowl and was retroactively selected as the 1929 national champion under the Houlgate System and also retroactively selected as the national champion under the Berryman QPRS system and as a co-national champion by Jeff Sagarin.

Schedule

Season summary

UCLA
Russ Saunders 14 rushes, 234 yards

References

USC
USC Trojans football seasons
Pac-12 Conference football champion seasons
Rose Bowl champion seasons
College football national champions
USC Trojans football